Petr Jíra (born August 10, 1978) is a Czech professional ice hockey player and head coach for Piráti Chomutov U20. He currently plays with Piráti Chomutov in the Krajská hokejová liga ústeckého kraje.

Jíra made his Czech Extraliga debut playing with HC Slavia Praha debut during the 2000–01 Czech Extraliga season.

References

External links

1978 births
Living people
Czech ice hockey right wingers
Piráti Chomutov players
Sportspeople from Chomutov
HC Slavia Praha players
Sportovní Klub Kadaň players